My Days with Gloria is a 2010 Argentine crime drama film directed by Juan José Jusid and starring Isabel Sarli and Luis Luque. The film was the official comeback of Isabel Sarli from acting after a ten plus years hiatus following La Dama Regresa (1996). It received mixed reviews.

Cast
 Isabel Sarli as Gloria Saten
 Luis Luque as Roberto
 Nicolás Repetto as Teniente Crinal
 Isabelita Sarli as Rita

References

External links
 

2010 crime drama films
2010 films
Political action films
Argentine crime drama films
2010s Argentine films